The distance between two parallel lines in the plane is the minimum distance between any two points.

Formula and proof 
Because the lines are parallel, the perpendicular distance between them is a constant, so it does not matter which point is chosen to measure the distance. Given the equations of two non-vertical parallel lines

the distance between the two lines is the distance between the two intersection points of these lines with the perpendicular line

This distance can be found by first solving the linear systems

and

to get the coordinates of the intersection points. The solutions to the linear systems are the points

and

The distance between the points is

which reduces to

When the lines are given by

the distance between them can be expressed as

See also
Distance from a point to a line

References
Abstand In: Schülerduden – Mathematik II. Bibliographisches Institut & F. A. Brockhaus, 2004, pp. 17-19 (German)
Hardt Krämer, Rolf Höwelmann, Ingo Klemisch: Analytische Geometrie und Lineare Akgebra. Diesterweg, 1988, p. 298 (German)

External links 
Florian Modler: Vektorprodukte, Abstandsaufgaben, Lagebeziehungen, Winkelberechnung – Wann welche Formel?, pp. 44-59 (German)
A. J. Hobson: “JUST THE MATHS” - UNIT NUMBER 8.5 - VECTORS 5 (Vector equations of straight lines), pp. 8-9

Euclidean geometry
Distance